Ngayong Pasko is the third studio album by Filipino bossa nova singer Sitti. It was released by Warner Music Philippines on October 6, 2008. It contains one original song, the Tagalog-language "Ngayong Pasko", which was released as the album's lead single.

Tracklist

References

2008 albums
2008 Christmas albums
Christmas albums by Filipino artists
Pop Christmas albums
Sitti albums
Warner Music Philippines albums